Pempwell is a hamlet near Stoke Climsland in Cornwall, England, UK.

References

Hamlets in Cornwall